María Teodora Elba Arrieta Pérez (born 7 January 1955) is a Mexican politician from the Institutional Revolutionary Party. From 2000 to 2003 she served as Deputy of the LVIII Legislature of the Mexican Congress representing the State of Mexico.

References

1955 births
Living people
Politicians from the State of Mexico
Women members of the Chamber of Deputies (Mexico)
Members of the Congress of the State of Mexico
Institutional Revolutionary Party politicians
20th-century Mexican politicians
20th-century Mexican women politicians
21st-century Mexican politicians
21st-century Mexican women politicians
Deputies of the LVIII Legislature of Mexico
Members of the Chamber of Deputies (Mexico) for the State of Mexico